Nutana Pioneer Cemetery is a cemetery located in the Diefenbaker Management Area of Saskatoon, Saskatchewan, Canada. The Cemetery is along the bank of the South Saskatchewan River, and is a designated Provincial heritage site.

Established in 1884, many of the earliest settlers in Saskatoon are buried at the cemetery.   The Nutana Cemetery Company owned the cemetery from 1905 until 1910 when it became the property of the City of Saskatoon.  Following the transfer to the city and due to the unstable river bank, only family and plot owners continued to be interred, with the last burial occurring in 1948. After 1910 burials were preferentially shifted to the Woodlawn Cemetery.

References

External links 
 

Cemeteries in Saskatchewan
Buildings and structures in Saskatoon
1884 establishments in the Northwest Territories
1884 establishments in Saskatchewan